John Andrew Quale is an American singer, songwriter, and performer best known by the stage name and persona of Prince Poppycock. Quale, who specializes in musical theater and opera, describes Prince Poppycock on his website as a "roguish operatic dandy."

Poppycock came to national attention in 2010 when he competed on the fifth season of America's Got Talent. On September 15, 2010, he was voted fourth place in the final four.

Early life and career
Quale was raised on a horse farm in Great Falls, Virginia. As a child, he sang "incessantly" and was a member of several children's choirs. His first public performance was at age 11 at Kennedy Center in the Children's Choir of the Washington National Opera. In his teenage years, Quale developed a love for writing music and became "enamored" with David Bowie, Depeche Mode, opera, madrigals, Gregorian chant, the Smiths and Gilbert and Sullivan. He also began recording his own music. While in high school, he spent several summers at Interlochen Arts Camp, a competitive performing arts program of the Interlochen Center for the Arts. His "flair for theater and arts made his teen years particularly tough," and bullying led him to drop out of high school in his junior year. Quale has since earned a GED. Quale performed and toured with musicals and choirs throughout high school and college. In December 2001, Quale joined Chicago synth-pop band Endora as lead singer and songwriter. Quale moved to Los Angeles around 2005 and studied musical theatre at the Beverly Hills Playhouse. Quale wrote and released a solo album, Worldview, and was one of several young gay performing artists profiled in Brian Gleason's documentary Rise Up and Shout!.

Quale played the role of Jesus in the musical The Beastly Bombing, which won the LA Weekly Theater Award for Best Musical and enjoyed two short runs Off Broadway in NYC. He also performed and entertained at La Belle Epoque, with Ann Magnuson at Redcat,<ref name="Frontiers">Lenora Claire, "19: Prince Poppycock: Randy Dandy", Frontiers'''s "Hot 25 of 2007".</ref> and has opened for The Dresden Dolls, Club Dandy, Wig Out, Dirty Deeds and Jer Ber Jones. Quale has studied voice for several years with Derek Graydon. Additionally, Quale has been collaborating with Kristian Hoffman, songwriter for The Mumps and Klaus Nomi, on a rock album entitled The Solipsist's Soliloquy.

Recently, John showed his support for the Trevor Project, a nationwide non-profit organization focused on suicide prevention efforts among lesbian, gay, bisexual, transgender and questioning (LGBTQ) youth, through his "It Gets Better" video.

Quale developed the Prince Poppycock character, an opera singer who performs in the elaborate dress of a baroque dandy, in 2006 so he could perform in a Los Angeles nightclub show.Maria Sciullo, "Richland singer in close race on 'Talent'", Pittsburgh Post-Gazette, September 08, 2010.  Quale was studying opera and had completed learning the Figaro baritone aria "Largo al factotum" from The Barber of Seville. A friend asked Quale to perform but stipulated he must wear a wig; he decided to perform as a "powdered-wigged baroque dandy, and highlight how the song was about being a fabulous hairdresser".

Poppycock "is my mask," says Quale in People Magazine. "Give a man a mask and he will tell you the truth, in the style of Commedia dell'arte." The New York Post noted Poppycock embodies the sensibility of "humor, irony and sarcasm". He wears elaborate costuming and "dresses as if he stepped out of a French Baroque painting (pantaloons, powdered wig and pasty makeup)." The New York Post called him "a towering, powder-faced concoction of glam-rock, synth-pop and light opera wrapped up in flamboyant period costumes." His face is matted with whiteface (or white clown) a symbol of the highest status in the clown hierarchy and the oldest of modern clown archetypes.

At first his mother was concerned for her openly gay son's new outrageous persona but now she "couldn't be more pleased". On Halloween, October 31, 2010, Prince Poppycock was crowned the honorary Mayor of West Hollywood for the Creative City's annual Halloween Carnaval.

America's Got Talent
In summer 2010, Quale auditioned and became one of the top four finalists on NBC's reality television talent show series America's Got Talent that features singers, dancers, magicians, comedians and other performers of all ages competing for the advertised top prize of US $1 million, and a show as the headliner on the Las Vegas Strip. The Tampa Tribune called him "one of the most unusual contestants in the show's history". They noted he's been called "a male Lady Gaga" and "the Adam Lambert of America's Got Talent, and that he "may be the most innovative act since Pee-wee Herman".

For the New York City auditions (June 8) he performed a modified—to fit the 90 second timeframe—and slightly personalized version of the Figaro aria ("Largo al factotum").Len Melisurgo, "'America's Got Talent' recap: Frat boys who float in the air, and Jersey guys who can't sing", The Star-Ledger, June 9, 2010. Sung at the first entrance of the title character, the repeated "Figaro"s before the final patter section are an icon in popular culture of operatic singing. Due to the fast tempo and tongue-twisting lines, the piece is often noted as one of the most difficult baritone arias to perform. In the pre-interview segment he noted the difficulty of the piece, as did the judges after the performance.

For the Las Vegas Week, Classical Singers performance (July 6) Quale's voice was compromised by illness but his overall performance of an abridged version of "La donna è mobile" ("Woman is fickle"), the cynical Duke of Mantua's canzone from Giuseppe Verdi's opera Rigoletto (1851), helped him advance to the Quarterfinals. The canzone is famous as a showcase for tenors. Quale could be seen struggling to hit the highest notes and was visibly upset that he could not be in better health.

For Week 4 of the quarterfinals (August 3) he performed "Vesti la giubba" ("Put on the costume"), a famous tenor aria from the opera Pagliacci by Ruggero Leoncavallo, and first performed in 1892. The aria exemplifies the entire notion of the 'tragic clown': smiling on the outside but crying on the inside. Quale was costumed by Steve LaNasa as a clown with a tear after he took off a large wrapped costuming, the costume was later lit up from inside with several hundred color-changing LEDs.

For Round 1 of the semifinals (August 24) Quale performed a modified version "Bohemian Rhapsody", a song by the British rock band Queen, written by Freddie Mercury for the album A Night at the Opera (1975).Episode 527 The song has no chorus, instead consisting of three main parts—a ballad segment ending with a guitar solo, an operatic passage, and a heavy rock section.

For the Top 10 show (September 7) Quale did a medley of "The Star-Spangled Banner", "The Yankee Doodle Boy", and "The Stars And Stripes Forever". In the middle he quoted from the second sentence of the United States' "Declaration of Independence", a sweeping statement of individual human rights, "We hold these truths to be self-evident, that all men are created equal ..." While he spoke, images of American civil rights icons Abraham Lincoln, Susan B. Anthony, Harvey Milk, and Rosa Parks were shown as well as an image of Poppycock on a $3 bill.

Quale stated he planned to have a more emotionally connected performance for the Final 4 show, "I feel it's a strength that I have as a performer that hasn't really been showcased as much because I've been focused so much on spectacle [for America's Got Talent]. I'll still bring spectacle, but hopefully an emotionally resonant performance as well." He performed "Nessun dorma" ("None shall sleep"), an aria from Giacomo Puccini's opera Turandot (1926). During the performance he was buzzed by judge Piers Morgan. He said, "I think you've blown it. ... You were guilty, I'm afraid, of that terrible crime that many contestants do at this stage, of taking yourself a little bit too seriously. And the whole point of Prince Poppycock is that you're great fun. You're a great showman. You make me smile. And you didn't make me smile tonight!" In the final performance before the votes came in, Piers Morgan buzzed Prince Poppycock during the climactic aria at the end of "Nessun Dorma". This was significant, because the celebrity judges were not supposed to be judging that performance, it was up to the viewers to choose the winner.  Morgan had no business hitting the buzzer.  Even then, the vast majority of public opinion had Prince PoppyCock as the winner.  HOWEVER, the votes got split between Prince Poppycock and Jackie Evancho.  That allowed a lesser singing act to come out the winner, beating out both Poppycock and Evancho, because they were competing for the same fan base, whereas the winner had no similar act to compete with.  Also, Prince Poppycock wanted to perform "Yankee Doodle Dandy" as his final performance, but was promised a REAL stallion if he performed Nessun Dorma as his final song instead.  When it came time for Poppycock's final performance, he suffered a costume malfunction involving the microphone, resulting in him having to tear his costume to perform his song. Also, instead of a real white stallion, they came up with a tacky fake absurd horse on wheels.

On the September 15, 2010 Finale, Poppycock opened the Finale Show with a duet with one of his favorite celebrities, singer and disco superstar Donna Summer. That night, he finished in fourth place. A day after the finale of America's Got Talent Poppycock made an appearance on The Tonight Show with Jay Leno in a segment called "The Ross Report" (with Ross Mathews) which he mentioned and posted pictures of on his Twitter page. The top ten finalists  performed in a 25-city tour of the US in October and November 2010.  He returned to AGT as a guest artist in August 2011.

Performances

Footnotes

References
 
 
 Ellis, Joseph. American Creation: Triumphs and Tragedies at the Founding of the Republic. New York: Knopf, 2007. .
 Lucas, Stephen E., "Justifying America: The Declaration of Independence as a Rhetorical Document," in Thomas W. Benson, ed., American Rhetoric: Context and Criticism (1989)
 Partridge, Eric, Tom Dalzell, Terry Victor, The New Partridge Dictionary of Slang and Unconventional English: J–Z'', Taylor & Francis, 2006, 9780415259385.

External links
 
 Prince Poppycock update, May 2011
 Prince Poppycock July 2011 interview
 Poppycock headlines the 2012 Black and White Party

1978 births
America's Got Talent contestants
21st-century American singers
Songwriters from Virginia
American LGBT musicians
LGBT people from Virginia
Living people
Singers from Virginia
People from Great Falls, Virginia
Classical musicians from Virginia
21st-century American male singers
American male songwriters